Qiu Miaojin (29 May 1969 – 25 June 1995), also romanized as Chiu Miao-chin, was a Taiwanese queer novelist. Qiu's fictional works are "frequently cited as classics", and her unapologetically lesbian sensibility has had a profound and lasting influence on LGBT literature in Taiwan.

Biography
Originally from Changhua County in western Taiwan, Qiu Miaojin attended the prestigious Taipei First Girls' High School and National Taiwan University, where she graduated with a major in psychology. She worked as a counselor and later as a reporter at the weekly magazine The Journalist. In 1994 she moved to Paris, where she pursued graduate studies in clinical psychology and feminism at University of Paris VIII, studying with philosopher Hélène Cixous.

Her death was a suicide. Most accounts suggest that she stabbed herself with a kitchen knife.

Writing
Qiu Miaojin's writing is influenced by the non-narrative structures of avant-garde and experimental film as well as European and Japanese literary modernisms. Her novels contain camera angles and ekphrasis in response to European art cinema, including allusions to directors such as Andrei Tarkovsky, Theo Angelopoulos, Derek Jarman, and Jean-Luc Godard. During her time in Paris, Qiu directed a short film titled Ghost Carnival. Her works as a filmmaker are in the collection of the Museum of Modern Art, New York.

Her best-known work is Notes of a Crocodile, for which she was posthumously awarded the China Times Literature Award in 1995. The main character's nickname, Lazi, is the direct source of a key slang term for "lesbian" in Chinese. Notes of a Crocodile was published in 1994, amid a Taiwanese media frenzy surrounding lesbians, including an incident in which a TV journalist secretly filmed patrons at a lesbian bar without their consent, resulting in some suicides, and the group suicide of two girls, rumored to have been lesbians, from the elite high school attended by several characters in the novel and by Qiu herself. Along with her final work before her death, Last Words from Montmartre, the novel has been widely described as "a cult classic."

Last Words From Montmartre is an epistolary novel that comprises 20 letters that can be read in any order, drawing on the notion of musical indeterminacy. Its prose appears to "blur distinctions between personal confession and lyric aphorism" according to a review in Rain Taxi. Dated between 27 April 1995, and 17 June 1995, about a week before the author killed herself, the letters begin with the dedication: "For dead little Bunny, and Myself, soon dead." It has been described as a work of relational art and noted for the required presence of the reader, "a 'you' to narrate to" that is a signature of Qiu's works. 

In 2007, a two-volume set of Qiu's diaries was published posthumously.

Legacy 
Qiu has been recognized as a literary national treasure and counterculture icon, as well as described as a "martyr" in the movement for LGBT rights in Taiwan. Her works are taught in high schools and colleges in Taiwan and have "become a literary model for many aspiring writers". Luo Yijun's book Forgetting Sorrow was written in her memory. Moreover, Taiwanese writer Li Kotomi explicitly cites Qiu's Notes of a Crocodile as an inspiration for her 2017 novel Solo Dance. Queer Sinophone scholar Fran Martin writes:

In 2017, her life and work became the subject of a documentary produced by Radio Television Hong Kong and directed by Evans Chan.

Bibliography

Novels
 Notes of a Crocodile《鱷魚手記》 (1994) - translated by Bonnie Huie (New York Review Books Classics, 2017) 
 Last Words from Montmartre 《蒙馬特遺書》 (1996) - translated by Ari Larissa Heinrich (New York Review Books Classics, 2014) 
 Letters from Montmartre (1996) - excerpt translated by Howard Goldblatt

Short stories
 "Platonic Hair" (1990) - translated by Fran Martin

See also
 Écriture féminine
 Post-structural feminism
 Queer theory

References

Further reading
"A Crocodile in Paris," by Ankita Chakraborty https://longreads.com/2018/06/07/a-crocodile-in-paris-the-queer-classics-of-qiu-miaojin/
"Afterword," by Ari Larissa Heinrich, in Last Words from Montmartre, by Qiu Miaojin, translated by Ari Larissa Heinrich. New York:  New York Review Books, 2014. 
"Begin Anywhere: Transgender and Transgenre Desire in Qiu Miaojin's Last Words from Montmartre," by Ari Larissa Heinrich, in Transgender China: Histories and Cultures, ed. Howard Chiang. New York: Palgrave MacMillan, 2012. , WorldCat
"Stigmatic Bodies: The Corporeal Qiu Miaojin," in Embodied Modernities: Corporeality, Representation, and Chinese Cultures eds. Fran Martin and Larissa Heinrich. Honolulu: University of Hawai'i Press, 2006. 
Martin, Fran. "Situating Sexualities: Queer Representation in Taiwanese Fiction, Film, and Public Culture," Hong Kong: Hong Kong University Press, 2003. 
Sang, Tze-Lan D. The Emerging Lesbian: Female Same-Sex Desire in Modern China, Chicago: University of Chicago Press, 2003.

External links
 Excerpt from Last Words from Montmartre in Words Without Borders
 Excerpt from Last Words from Montmartre in Lonely Girl Phenomenology (magazine)
 Excerpt from Last Words from Montmartre in Guernica (magazine)
 Podcast reading and interview with the translator of Last Words from Montmartre
 "The Kids Are Too Straight: Translating Qiu Miaojin's Notes of a Crocodile" in Kyoto Journal
 First excerpt from Notes of a Crocodile in The Brooklyn Rail
 Second excerpt from Notes of a Crocodile in The Margins, published by Asian American Writers' Workshop
 Third excerpt from Notes of a Crocodile in Words Without Borders
 "In Praise of the Fuck-Up: On Translating Qiu Miaojin" at PEN.org

1969 births
1995 suicides
Lesbian writers
Taiwanese LGBT writers
LGBT culture in Taiwan
Postmodern writers
Taiwanese diarists
Taiwanese memoirists
National Taiwan University alumni
University of Paris alumni
People from Changhua County
Suicides in France
Taiwanese women novelists
Taiwanese novelists
Taiwanese expatriates in France
Women memoirists
20th-century women writers
20th-century novelists
20th-century Taiwanese writers
20th-century memoirists
20th-century diarists
20th-century LGBT people